H'Mount Sinai Senior High School is a coeducational first-cycle institution in Akropong in the Eastern Region of Ghana.

The school runs courses in Business, Science, general arts, general agric, Home Economics and visual arts, leading to the award of a West African Senior School Certificate (WASSCE).

History 
A community-based institution that was established in 1978 by the Sacred order of the Brotherhood mission. The general objective of its establishments was to provide full secondary school education to the growing number of boys and girls, especially those resident around the Akropong community.

The school runs both day, boarding and hostel system with majority of the students in the boarding house.

The schools colors are pink and blue. The school has on this grounds trained a lot of diligent men and women in godliness, good character and responsible.

The school has the twin towers of the Sacred Order of the Silent Brotherhood mission with various floors serving as classrooms and offices. The structure was put up by the Silent Brotherhood mission in 1978.

In 2019, the school knocked out St. Roses Senior High School from the National Science and Maths Quiz (NSMQ) regional contest to qualify for the national contest.

Enrollment 
The school has about 2,500 students enrolled in Business, Science, general arts, general agric, Home Economics and visual arts courses.

Facilities 

 3 Science Laboratories ( Physics, Biology and Chemistry)
 I.C.T Lab
 Library
 Home Economics Lab
 Visual Arts Center
 School Farm
 Sports (standard field for soccer and athletics, basketball court, volley and handball court)
 School Clinic
 Barbering shop

See also 

 Education in Ghana
 List of senior high schools in Ghana

References 

1978 establishments in Ghana
Education in the Eastern Region (Ghana)
Educational institutions established in 1978
High schools in Ghana